Thạch Sơn may refer to several places in Vietnam, including:

, a rural commune of Anh Sơn District
, a rural commune of Lâm Thao District
, a rural commune of Thạch Hà District
, a rural commune of Thạch Thành District
 Former Thạch Sơn commune of Sơn Động District, Bắc Giang Province; now part of Phúc Sơn commune